The Maritime, Fluvial and Harbour Museum of Rouen is a museum dedicated to the history of the port of Rouen, which is one of the greatest ports of France. The museum opened in 1999, during the Rouen Armada, a festival of tall ships which takes place every five years.

The museum 

The main themes are:
 History of the port, with photos, and an exhibition space about the destruction caused by World War II
 Infrastructure of the port and the measures needed to render the Seine navigable
 Heritage of Rouen in the Age of Sail, with an exhibit on the ships which transported nickel from New Caledonia
 The merchant navy, with numerous models of cargo ships, including some which formerly docked at or near Building 13, which now houses the museum
 River navigation
 Shipbuilding
 Whale hunting, with a whale skeleton (see below)
 The history of submarines, with a reproduction of the interior of Robert Fulton's Nautilus

Visitors can see trawler and barge motors, a fog warning bell which was formerly located in the estuary of the Risle, surface-supplied diving gear and a reproduction of the radio cabin of a 1960s ship.

The skeleton of a whale (on loan from the Natural History Museum of Rouen) is exhibited in the centre of the museum. It is a fin whale which was 7 years old when it died after grounding on a beach.

A 38-metre barge, the Pompon Rouge, is exhibited in the courtyard of the museum. Its hold has been transformed into an exhibition room about river navigation, including a model of a lock.

In addition, there are regular temporary exhibitions on a variety of topics, such as the Rouen transporter bridge or the vikings.

Pictures

The site 

The museum is located in a former port building, Building 13, not far from the new Gustave Flaubert Bridge.  The building was built in 1926, and was called Building M until 1966, when the Autonomous Port of Rouen (Port autonome de Rouen) was created.

Until the 1970s it was leased to the Schiaffino Company, which transported wine between Rouen and North Africa and used it as a wine warehouse until a special wine building was built, and thereafter mainly for fruit.

The building was subsequently used by a series of different companies until 1984, when it became surplus because of insufficient size.

See also 
 Maritime museum

External links 

 Musée maritime fluvial et portuaire de Rouen Official site.

Museums in Rouen
Local museums in France
Maritime museums in France